"They Can't Take Away Our Music" is a song performed by Eric Burdon & War featuring Sharone Scott & The Beautiful New Born Children. It was released as a single in 1970. This was their last single before they split in the same year.

Chart performance
"They Can't Take Away Our Music" charted #50 on the US Hot 100 chart, and #35 on the Canadian chart.

Cover versions
It was subsequently recorded by several other artists with the most successful remake done by Donna Summer in 1994.

References

1970 singles
Eric Burdon songs
War (American band) songs
Soul songs
Songs written by Jerry Goldstein (producer)
Song recordings produced by Jerry Goldstein (producer)
1970 songs
MGM Records singles